The individual mass start competition of the 2015 Winter Universiade was held at the Sporting Centre FIS Štrbské Pleso on January 29. It consisted of a 10 km cross-country race followed by 2 jumps on the normal hill which are not judged.

Results

Cross-country

Ski jumping

References 

Individual Mass Start